Henry Tucker (1742-1800) was a Bermudian politician, and a member of a family that had been prominent in Bermuda since the 1616 appointment of Captain Daniel Tucker as Governor of Bermuda. Henry Tucker was the President of the Governor's Council of the British colony of Bermuda (which had combined the roles of a Cabinet and an Upper House to the House of Assembly of Bermuda) from 1775 to 1807. Prominent men at that time filled a variety of civil and military roles by appointment, and Tucker was also appointed the Colonial Secretary of Bermuda and Provost Marshal General of Bermuda after the resignation of W. O'Brien from those positions in 1785. He was acting Governor of Bermuda in 1796, pending the arrival of new Governor William Campbell. Campbell died almost immediately upon arrival and Tucker resumed the acting Governorship from 1796 to 1798, and again from 1803 to 1805, and in 1806.

Henry's father was Henry Tucker of The Grove, at various times a Member of the Council, of the House of Assembly, and an officer of the Militia who would rise to the rank of Colonel. Bermuda's closest links were with the southern British colonies in North America, especially Virginia (of which it had originally been a part) and South Carolina (which, as part of the Province of Carolina had been settled from Bermuda in 1670 under William Sayle, and still had a sizeable and influential enclave of Bermudians). Bermudians had abandoned agriculture after the 1684 dissolution of the Somers Isles Company, and had developed a maritime economy. Bermudians built large numbers of ships, including the Bermuda sloop, with which they explored every opportunity to exploit distant markets. This meant, however, that they became completely dependent on trade for foodstuffs and basic supplies, and their primary trading partners were the now rebellious American colonies. The ban on trade with the rebels that followed the outbreak of the war meant Bermuda was faced with economic ruin and famine. Colonel Henry Tucker was sent as a Bermudian delegate to the rebel Continental Congress in Philadelphia, where he orchestrated with Benjamin Franklin the theft of a hundred barrels of gunpowder from a magazine in St. George's, Bermuda. The gunpowder was stolen during the night of the 14 August 1775, and rowed out to waiting American vessels which delivered it to the rebel army, even as another rebel vessel was sent to Bermuda by George Washington tasked with the same mission. Washington was unaware of Tucker and Franklin's plot, and sent a letter addressed to the people of Bermuda requesting their assistance.

The letter from Washington had read:

His father's activities were not the extent of the treasons of President Henry Tucker's family. Two of his brothers, St. George Tucker and Thomas Tudor Tucker, had emigrated to the continent before the war, and both served the rebels.  St. George was a Lieutenant-Colonel in the Virginia Militia, and was wounded at both the Battle of Guilford Court House and the Siege of Yorktown. Thomas Tudor served as a  surgeon in the Continental Army from 1781 to 1783. He was a South Carolina delegate to the Continental Congress in 1787 and 1788, and later represented South Carolina in the United States House of Representatives, and served as Treasurer of the United States from 1801 to his death in 1828.

Bermuda remained a British colony after the war, and became the lynch pin of the Royal Navy's control of North American and West Indian waters after the loss of all her continental bases between The Maritimes and the West Indies, with increasing interest and interference taken by the British Government in its internal self-government. The loyalties of Bermudians were considered highly suspect after the war, during which they had traded with the rebels and supplied them with large numbers of fighting ships, in addition to stolen gunpowder. The activities of his father and brothers might have cast a shadow on Henry Tucker's political career, but he was advantageously married to Frances Brueure, the daughter of the wartime Governor, Lieutenant-Colonel George James Bruere. Brueure was Bermuda's longest serving Governor, having been appointed in 1764. His death in office in 1780 was thought to have resulted from the stress of governing a colony that was almost in rebellion. He was succeeded by his son, Lieutenant George Brueure (1744–1786), of the 18th Regiment of Dragoons, who had been wounded at the Battle of Bunker Hill. Tucker's brother-in-law had a short Governorship, having set himself against the elder Henry Tucker and the other members of Bermuda's economic and political elite.

References

Governors of Bermuda
Colonial Secretaries of Bermuda
1742 births
1800 deaths
Henry Tucker